Stanley Boggs (1910–1991) was an American archaeologist who restored numerous archeological sites in Central America.

1910 births
1991 deaths
20th-century American archaeologists